Klavs Rasmussen (born 23 June 1966) is a Danish football manager most recently in charge of Ghanaian football club West African Football Academy.

Rasmussen had worked as a youth coach at KB for 20 years, when he became assistant manager at Odense Boldklub in January 2002. In January 2004, he became joint manager of the club together with Troels Bech. They were both sacked in June 2005.

He later managed BK Avarta, Ølstykke FC, the women’s team of Brøndby IF, and Næstved Boldklub.

On 28 June 2012, he was named new manager of Hobro IK. He resigned on 17 January 2013.

In November 2016, he was announced as the new head coach of the Ghanaian football club West African Football Academy. He resigned on 20 April 2018, following a string of four defeats.

References

1966 births
Living people
Danish football managers
BK Avarta managers
West African Football Academy managers
Expatriate football managers in Ghana
Ghana Premier League managers